HMS Maidstone was a submarine depot ship of the Royal Navy. She was purpose built to support 12 of the new 'D' Class submarines under the 1910/11 Naval Programme.

Pennant numbers

Service History

Pre-war
Maidstone commissioned at Portsmouth on 15 October 1912, as the principal depot ship of the officer commanding the newly established 8th Submarine Flotilla. This was the offensive submarine force based in UK waters.

First World War
Maidstone led the 8th Submarine Flotilla to its war station at Harwich in the 1914 mobilisation. She remained the principal depot ship for the offensive submarine force at Harwich for the duration of the hostilities. Maidstone'''s Flotilla was re-established as the 9th Submarine Flotilla in August 1916. However, this was only a change of the flotilla number and there was no change in her duties.

FateMaidstone decommissioned from service on 15 December 1927. She was sold on 31 August 1929.

Sources
 
 The National Archives:ADM 186/15: War Vessels and Aircraft (British and Foreign): Quarterly Return, Oct 1915 The National Archives:ADM 53/23406, 47893-47941, 80240-80247: Logs of HMS Maidstone''

References

External links
 

Ships built on the River Clyde
Auxiliary ships of the Royal Navy
Royal Navy Submarine Depot Ships
1912 ships